The Oberheim OB-8 is a subtractive analog synthesizer launched by Oberheim in early 1983 and discontinued in 1985. As the fourth product in the OB-series of polyphonic compact synthesizers, the OB-8 was the successor to the OB-Xa. The number of production was about 3,000 units.

The OB-8 features eight-voice polyphony, two-part multi-timbrality, a 61-note processor-controlled piano keyboard, sophisticated programmable LFO and envelope modulation, two-pole and four-pole filters, arpeggiator, external cassette storage, MIDI capability and 120 memory patches, 24 bi-timbral patches, and used the Z80 CPU. The musician's interface also consists of two pages of front panel programmable controls, left panel performance controls and a set of foot pedals and switches.

Artists who have used the OB-8 include Alice Coltrane, in her ashram music, Boys Noize, Ou Est Le Swimming Pool, Prince, Spinetta Jade, Queen, Van Halen, Depeche Mode, The War on Drugs, Styx, Kool & The Gang, Jimmy Jam and Terry Lewis, Clarence Jey, The Police, Siekiera, Silent Running, The KLF, Future Sound of London, Barnes & Barnes and Nik Kershaw.

Notable OB-8 users

Art of Noise
Simple Minds
Jimmy Jam
The KLF
Soul II Soul
Pet Shop Boys

Hardware re-issues and recreations 
In May, 2022, the Oberheim OB-X8, a new 8-voice analog synthesizer with the voice architecture and filters of three classic Oberheim models: the OB-X, OB-Xa, and OB-8, along with functionality and features not included on the original models, was announced. The new synthesizer is manufactured by Sequential in partnership with Tom Oberheim.

References

 Vintage Synth: Oberheim OB-8
 Image of OB-8 : image source, copyright details
  Keyboard Museum
 GreatSynthesizers: Oberheim OB-8

Oberheim synthesizers
Analog synthesizers
Polyphonic synthesizers
Z80